San Juan de la Rambla is a town and a municipality in the northern part of the island of Tenerife, one of the Canary Islands, and part of the province of Santa Cruz de Tenerife, Spain. It is located on the north coast, 12 km west of La Orotava and 40 km west of the island's capital Santa Cruz de Tenerife. The population is 5,110 (2013) and the area is 20.67 km².

Historical population

See also
List of municipalities in Santa Cruz de Tenerife

References 

Municipalities in Tenerife